Sarród is a village in Győr-Moson-Sopron County, Hungary. It lies adjacent to the Fertő-Hanság National Park, a World Heritage site.

References

Populated places in Győr-Moson-Sopron County